The Women's synchronized 3 metre springboard competition at the 2019 World Aquatics Championships was held on 15 July 2019.

Results
The preliminary round was started at 10:00. The final was held at 15:30.

Green denotes finalists

References

Women's synchronized 3 metre springboard